Shogun and Little Kitchen is a 1992 Hong Kong comedy film directed by Ronny Yu and starring Yuen Biao, Leon Lai, Ng Man-tat, Maggie Shiu and Monica Chan.

Plot
Uncle Bo (Ng Man-tat) is the owner of the Tai Ping Fong old building. He inherited the building from his late wife years ago and he would rent different units to others. Although the tenants do not actually pay rent, Bo maintains a good relationship with them just like a big family. On the contrary, rich heir Lam Fung's (Leon Lai) relationship with his father Lam Chung-yuen (Jimmy Wang Yu) is very cold due to his hatred of his father. On the day of his birthday, Fung gets into an argument with his father and runs away from home. Afterwards, Fung was robbed and beaten into a coma by a crock. Uncle Bo finds Fung collapsed and brings him to Tai Ping Fong to heal him.

At Tai Ping Fong, Fung experiences love and care by others. There, Fung also develops a relationship with Bo's daughter, Maggie (Maggie Shiu). However, Maggie was angry after she discovers Fung's true identity. Furthermore, Bo's uncle, Tang Tai-chi (Yuen Biao), whom recently arrived to Hong Kong from Beijing, was poached by a catering company due to his amazing cooking and acrobatic skills. Bo feels betrayed by Chi and they fell out. Later, Bo's building was also acquired by the Lam Enterprises. Because Bo was reluctant to sell the building, Lam Chung-yuen's assistant, Raymond (Lam Lap-sam), hires triad thugs to force Bo to sign the contract.

Cast

Reception

Critical
Love HK Film gave the film a positive review and writes "Standard formula and annoyingly cute subplots drag the film down, but Yuen Biao's athletic stuntwork makes the movie a fun, if not crucial viewing experience. The film doesn't challenge you in any way, but it's really not meant to. Undemanding fun."

Box office
The film grossed HK$9,687,943 at the Hong Kong box office during its theatrical run from 19 March to 13 April 1992 in Hong Kong.

See also
Yuen Biao filmography

References

External links

Shogun and Little Kitchen at Hong Kong Cinemagic

1992 films
1992 comedy films
Hong Kong comedy films
Cooking films
Hong Kong cuisine
Films directed by Ronny Yu
1990s Cantonese-language films
Films set in Hong Kong
Films shot in Hong Kong
Films with screenplays by James Yuen
1990s Hong Kong films